Wildcat Creek is a stream in the U.S. state of Kansas. It is a tributary to Munkers Creek.

Wildcat Creek was named for the wildcats which once were abounded in the area.

References

Rivers of Kansas
Rivers of Morris County, Kansas